Sharon Nadunga (born 2001 or 2002), also spelled Sharon Naddunga, is a Ugandan footballer who plays as a forward for FUFA Women Super League club Kawempe Muslim Ladies FC and the Uganda women's national team.

Club career
Nadunga has played for Kawempe Muslim Ladies in Uganda.

International career
Nadunga capped for Uganda at senior level during the 2021 COSAFA Women's Championship.

References

External links

2000s births
Living people
Sportspeople from Kampala
Ugandan women's footballers
Women's association football forwards
Uganda women's international footballers